Hayley Elizabeth Atwell (born 5 April 1982) is a British and American actress. Born and raised in London, Atwell studied acting at the Guildhall School of Music and Drama, and made her stage debut in a 2005 production of James Kerr's translation of the Ancient Greek tragedy Prometheus Bound. 

She subsequently appeared in multiple West End productions and on television, and was recognised for her breakthrough role as Lady Elizabeth Foster in The Duchess (2008), for which she was nominated for a British Independent Film Award for Best Supporting Actress. Her leading performance in the miniseries The Pillars of the Earth (2010) earned her a nomination for the Golden Globe Award for Best Actress - Miniseries or Television Film.

Atwell rose to international prominence with her portrayal of Agent Peggy Carter in the Marvel Cinematic Universe superhero film Captain America: The First Avenger (2011), a role she reprised in the short film Agent Carter (2013) and the 2015–2016 television series of the same name in addition to other films and live-action and animated series. She also had roles in the war drama Testament of Youth (2014), the romantic fantasy Cinderella (2015), and the fantasy comedy-drama Christopher Robin (2018).

On the stage, Atwell has received Laurence Olivier Award nominations for Best Supporting Actress, for her role in A View from the Bridge (2010), and for Best Actress, for her leading performances in The Pride (2013) and Rosmersholm (2020). In 2020, Atwell began hosting the podcast series True Spies, which aims to give an insight into the world of espionage by asking listeners what they would do in real-life spy situations.

Early life
Hayley Elizabeth Atwell was born on 5 April 1982 in London as the only child of her parents; her mother, Allison Cain, is British and her father, Grant Atwell, is an American photographer from Kansas City, Missouri, of Irish and partial Native American descent. Atwell has dual citizenship of the United Kingdom and the United States. 

After attending Sion-Manning Roman Catholic Girls' School in London, she took her A-Levels at the London Oratory School.

Atwell took two years off to travel with her father and work for a casting director. She then enrolled at the Guildhall School of Music and Drama, where she trained for three years, graduating in 2005 with a Bachelor of Arts degree in acting. 

Her contemporaries at Guildhall included actress Jodie Whittaker, whom Atwell later described as a "great friend", and Michelle Dockery, with whom she later worked in Restless.

Career

2005–2013: Early roles and breakthrough
Atwell made her professional debut in 2005, portraying Io, a maiden exiled by Zeus, in  Prometheus Bound at the Sound Theatre in London. The British Theatre Guide praised her performance, writing that Atwell "makes us respond to the anguish without for a moment inviting a chuckle at her bandaged hands". The following year, she starred as the protagonist's wife, Bianca, in Women Beware Women at the Royal Shakespeare Company. The Guardian praised Atwell for projecting "the right seductive beauty". Atwell then appeared in two productions at the Royal National Theatre, both directed by Nicholas Hytner. She portrayed Belinda, a SoHo PR worker and one of three love interests, in Man of Mode. Atwell also starred in Major Barbara for which she received an Ian Charleson Commendation. In 2009, Atwell made her West End debut as Catherine, the adopted niece in a troubled household, in Lindsay Posner's A View From the Bridge. Variety praised her for having an "ideal freshness" and girlishness while still able to shift into uncontrolled rage; her performance was later nominated for an Olivier Award.

Atwell's first major on-screen television role came in 2006 with BBC Two's miniseries The Line of Beauty. Later in the year, Atwell appeared as '415' in AMC Television's November 2009 miniseries The Prisoner, a remake of the 1967–68 series by the same name. In 2010 Atwell appeared in Channel 4's adaptation of William Boyd's Any Human Heart, and later that year, Ken Follett's miniseries Pillars of the Earth, which co-starred Eddie Redmayne; for which she was nominated for a Golden Globe. In 2013, Atwell starred in BBC Two's adaptation of William Boyd's espionage novel, Restless, before starring in "Be Right Back", an episode in Charlie Brooker's critically acclaimed science fiction television series Black Mirror. Atwell made the transition to film roles early on, with her first major role coming in Woody Allen's 2007 film Cassandra's Dream, playing stage actress Angela Stark. In 2008, she appeared in the film The Duchess, which earned her a Best Supporting Actress nomination at the British Independent Film Awards. Later that year, Atwell appeared in the Miramax film Brideshead Revisited.

Atwell played Agent Peggy Carter in the 2011 American superhero film Captain America: The First Avenger. MTV Networks' NextMovie.com named her one of the "Breakout Stars to Watch for in 2011". Atwell voiced Carter in the 2011 video game Captain America: Super Soldier.

Following a short break from the theatre, Atwell starred in Alexi Kaye Campbell's 2011 production of The Faith Machine, directed by Jamie Lloyd at the Royal Court Theatre. In 2013, Atwell collaborated with Alexi Kaye Campbell and Jamie Lloyd again in a revival of The Pride at Trafalgar Studios; her performance gained her a second Olivier Award nomination for Best Actress. She reprised her role as Carter in the 2013 short film Agent Carter.

2014–present: Further work and recognition

Atwell returned to Marvel for the 2014 film Captain America: The Winter Soldier, and in the 2015 films Avengers: Age of Ultron and Ant-Man. As Carter, she appeared in two episodes of the ABC television show Agents of S.H.I.E.L.D., and as the lead role in Marvel's Agent Carter, which aired from 2015 to 2016. Agent Carter was cancelled by ABC on 12 May 2016. She also provided Carter's voice in Lego Marvel's Avengers and Avengers: Secret Wars. In 2015, Atwell played Cinderella's mother in Disney's live action adaptation of Cinderella directed by Kenneth Branagh.

In February 2016, Atwell was cast in the ABC series Conviction. The series aired 13 episodes between October 2016 and January 2017; in May 2017, ABC announced it had been cancelled. Atwell starred as Margaret Schlegel in BBC One's 2017–2018 miniseries, Howards End, based on the classic E.M. Forster novel and adapted by playwright Kenneth Lonergan. In 2018, she played Evelyn Robin, the wife of the titular character in Disney's live action Winnie-the-Pooh film Christopher Robin directed by Marc Forster and co-starring with Ewan McGregor.

Atwell returned to the stage in 2018 in Dry Powder at the Hampstead Theatre and later appeared in Josie Rourke's Measure for Measure at the Donmar Warehouse, opposite Jack Lowden. The production gained critical acclaim, with The Daily Telegraph adding that it was "beautifully staged and expertly performed". As a result of positive reception, the play's run was extended.

In 2019, Atwell starred opposite Tamara Lawrance in a three-part BBC adaptation of Andrea Levy's novel The Long Song, about a slave on a sugar plantation in 19th-century Jamaica. She also reprised the role of Peggy Carter in Avengers: Endgame. In September 2019, it was announced that Atwell will star in Mission: Impossible – Dead Reckoning Part One and Mission: Impossible – Dead Reckoning Part Two, both directed by Christopher McQuarrie and scheduled to be theatrically released in the United States in 2023 and 2024, respectively. In 2021, early reviews for Peter Rabbit 2: The Runaway revealed Atwell as part of the film's voice cast as Mittens the cat. In 2022, Atwell partnered with The Picturehouse as part of the Picturehouse Ambassador Program as part of her 
own program Hayley Selects.

In the media 
Described as the "queen of period-drama" by The Guardian, Atwell has been praised by directors for "the professional example she sets" and her work in period-drama films and television shows. Atwell received an Ian Charleson Commendation for her work in Major Barbara (2009), and has received three Laurence Olivier Award nominations, first for her work in A View from the Bridge (2009), then in 2011 for her work in the revival of The Pride, and once again in 2020 for her performance as Rebecca West in Rosmersholm. Atwell was also nominated for a WhatsOnStage Award for her role in The Pride.

Personal life 

In 2010, Atwell lived in a flat in London. In 2015, she moved to Los Angeles to be close to the production of Agent Carter, although she still retained her personal base in London. During the filming of Captain America: The First Avenger in 2010, Atwell took a three-month course in art history and haiku at the Open University.

In October 2017, at the time of the accusations against Harvey Weinstein, a story emerged that, during filming of Brideshead Revisited in 2007, Weinstein had told Atwell she looked like a "fat pig" on screen and should eat less. Atwell later gave her own memory of events, saying that someone unconnected to Weinstein had suggested she lose weight to look more like a flapper. She also said that she did not believe that Weinstein was a sex addict, but a predator who should be punished for harassing women.

In a 2015 interview, Atwell discussed how her role as Peggy Carter influenced a then-recent tweet she made to her Twitter followers about having her image digitally altered on the cover of a German magazine. When one visitor to her page asked her, "Why are you so beautiful?", she retorted, "Why am I so photoshopped?" In the interview, Atwell stated, "It's important that young girls understand what photoshop is. I do feel a certain amount of responsibility now that I'm playing Peggy."

Filmography

Film

Television

Video games

Stage

Radio

Awards and nominations

References

External links 

 
 
 

1982 births
21st-century American actresses
21st-century English actresses
Actresses from London
Alumni of the Guildhall School of Music and Drama
American film actresses
American people of English descent
American people of Irish descent
American people who self-identify as being of Native American descent
American stage actresses
American television actresses
American video game actresses
American voice actresses
Audiobook narrators
British film actresses
British people of American descent
British people of Irish descent
British people of Native American descent
British stage actresses
British television actresses
British video game actresses
British voice actresses
English film actresses
English people of American descent
English people of Irish descent
English people of Native American descent
English stage actresses
English television actresses
English video game actresses
English voice actresses
Living people
People educated at London Oratory School
Royal Shakespeare Company members
English radio actresses